Itaim Bibi is a district in the subprefecture of Pinheiros in the city of São Paulo, Brazil. It includes in its area an eponymous neighborhood.

Google São Paulo has its offices in the area.

History
The District of Peace of Itaim was established by virtue of State Decree No. 6731 of October 4, 1934.

References

Districts of São Paulo